Sibelius is a 2003 Finnish film biography of Jean Sibelius directed and written by Timo Koivusalo. It is the first full-length feature film about the famous composer.

Plot
While Johan Julius Christian ("Jean") Sibelius is still a child, his father Christian dies; the family is facing a financial disaster and must sell their property. Young Sibelius finds a new father figure in Uncle Pehr.

At the beginning of his musical studies with Martin Wegelius, Sibelius adopts the name of his uncle Jean. Plagued with insecurity, he continues to study law and, on the advice of his professor, returns to the music that is close to his heart while not interested in the law.

Sibelius meets Aino, daughter of his artistic sponsor Elisabeth Järnefelt and his future wife; Sibelius also comes into contact with composers such as Robert Kajanus and Ferruccio Busoni. Aino is impressed by the works of her writer friend Juhani Aho. During a one-year scholarship in Berlin, organized by Wegelius in 1889, he has to face the critical needs of his teacher Albert Becker. Sibelius deepens his friendship with the writer Adolf Paul. During his stay in Berlin, Uncle Pehr dies.

After returning from Berlin, Sibelius declares his love to Aino. Shortly after the engagement he begins a study visit to Vienna, where he establishes important social contacts. There, however, his plans to pursue a career as a violinist fail. Sibelius is plagued with jealousy when it is discovered that Juhani Aho has expressed his love for Aino in a novel.

When Sibelius returns to Finland, he and Aino get married. Sibelius celebrates his first success with his symphonic poem Kullervo. Soon the first daughter Eva is born. When Russian Tsar Alexander III died in 1894, Sibelius' friends worry about how Russian rule in Finland will develop under the new Tsar Nicholas II.

The Sibelius family grows with the birth of more daughters; Sibelius, however, focuses entirely on composition, which leads to an upheaval of the marriage. Shortly afterwards Sibelius's mother Maria dies. Sibelius and Kajanus challenge the escalation of Russian censorship with a performance of Sibelius Finland's patriotic symphonic poem.

On the other hand, Sibelius soon faces the loss of his daughter Kirsti, who dies of typhus. During a stay of the Sibelius family in Rapallo, Italy, one of the surviving daughters falls ill, but recovers to the family's great relief. Sibelius composes his second symphony in Rapallo, the premiere of which will be a great success.

In building their home, Ainola, on Lake Tuusulanjärvi, the Sibelius couple face financial problems. Sibelius's sick sister has to go to the sanatorium; Sibelius himself suffers from ringing in his ears and the consequences of his drinking habit; after an operation for a tumor, Sibelius stops smoking and drinking.

After composing the King Christian Suite, Sibelius writes the Jääkärimarssi for the troops fighting against Russia during the October Revolution. As a result of the riots, the Red Army searches for weapons in his home. Due to the composition of the Jääkärimarssi, Sibelius has to flee with his family.

In old age, Sibelius burns his plans for an eighth symphony.

Cast

Martti Suosalo as younger Jean Sibelius
Heikki Nousiainen as old Jean Sibelius
Miina Turunen as younger Aino Sibelius
Seela Sella as old Aino Sibelius
Vesa Vierikko as Robert Kajanus
Raimo Grönberg as Martin Wegelius
Jarmo Mäkinen as Akseli Gallen-Kallela
Tapani Kalliomäki as Armas Järnefelt
Kunto Ojansivu as Adolf Paul
Rea Mauranen as Maria Sibelius
Petri Lairikko as Axel Carpelan
Kirsi Tarvainen as Linda Sibelius
Christian Sandström as Christian Sibelius
Erkki Ruokokoski as Pehr-uncle
Olavi Niemelä as George Becker
Risto Kaskilahti as Sigurd Wettenhovi-Aspa
Hannu Kivioja as Ferruccio Busoni
Ritva Jalonen as Pauline Lucca
Paavo Liski as Konni Zilliacus
Susanna Palin as Saimi Järnefelt
Eija Nousiainen as Elisabeth Järnefelt
Konsta Hannonen as Juhani Aho
Kari Hietalahti as Eino Leino
Lars Svedberg as Santeri Levas
Eveliina Puhakka as Sibelius daughter
Johanna Puhakka as Sibelius daughter
Pauliina Puhakka as Sibelius daughter
Aliisa Kuivasto as Sibelius daughter
Veera Välimäki as Sibelius daughter

External links

2003 films
Finnish biographical drama films
2000s Finnish-language films
Film
Films about classical music and musicians
Films about composers
Films shot in Latvia
Films shot in Italy
Films directed by Timo Koivusalo